Founded in 1935, Millfield is a co-educational Independent school for pupils aged 13–18 years based in Street, Somerset, England.

Millfield is a registered charity and is the largest co-educational boarding school in the UK with approximately 1,240 pupils, of whom over 950 are full boarders of over 65 nationalities. Millfield Development and the Millfield Foundation, raises money to fund scholarships and bursaries. The school is a member of the G20 Schools Group and a member of the Headmasters' and Headmistresses' Conference. The Millfield campus is based over 240 acres in Somerset, in Street, in the South West of England.

Former pupils of Millfield school in Somerset are known as Old Millfieldians or OMs.

Notable OMs

A
 Adwoa Aboah, British fashion model and activist
 Kesewa Aboah, British fashion model and visual artist
 Alexander, Crown Prince of Yugoslavia
 Tom Alexander, businessman
 Anthony Allen - England rugby union player
 Lily Allen, singer-songwriter
 Prince Asem bin Al Nayef
Sheikh Sultan bin Zayed bin Sultan Al Nahyan, deputy prime minister of the United Arab Emirates
 His Royal Highness Sultan Ghalib bin Awadh Al-Qu'aiti, Sultan of Hadhramaut
 Damian Aspinall, casino and zoo owner.
 Darren Atkins - Rugby Union Player 
 Joanne Atkinson - British Olympic swimmer
 Jon Atkinson - cricketer

B
 Lucy Bailey - theatre director
 Ian Balding - racehorse trainer
 Brian Barnes - golfer
 Joey Barrington, England international squash player
 Stephen Batchelor - Olympic Gold medal winner — hockey
 Josh Bayliss - Rugby Union for Bath Rugby
 John Lane Bell, mathematician and philosopher
 Daniel Bell-Drummond, cricketer
 Jon Bentley, journalist and TV presenter
 Tom Bertram - international hockey player
 Mary Bignal-Rand, long jump gold medallist in 1964 Olympics
 Salem Bin Laden, brother of Osama Bin Laden
 Sam Bird - racing driver
 Tony Blackburn, radio DJ
 John Brake, rugby player, Northampton Saints, England Sevens and England Under U-18 rugby union player
 The 3rd Viscount Brookeborough, Ulster nobleman who is Lord in Waiting to H.M. The Queen
 The 5th Baron Brougham and Vaux, politician
 Charles R. Burton - explorer

C
 Richard Caring, businessman
 Andrew Castle, tennis player and GMTV presenter
 Daniel Catán, composer 
 Julian Cayo-Evans, Welsh political activist and leader of the Free Wales Army
 Jason Connery, actor
 Stewart Copeland, musician
 Mark Cox - tennis player.
 Victor Chandler, bookmaker

D

 Sophie Dahl, model
 Peter Denning, Somerset cricketer
 Dominic Dromgoole, theatre director and critic
 Chutima Chantelle Durongdej, Miss Thailand Universe 2009 and Miss Photogenic in the 2009 Miss Universe pageant
 Wes Durston, cricketer
 John Dunn, political theorist
 Ted Dwane, musician & member of Mumford and Sons

E
 Sir Gareth Edwards, British Lions and Wales rugby international
 Jeremy Edwards, actor (Hollyoaks and Celebrity Big Brother 2005 )
 Jago Eliot, Lord Eliot, surf champion and bon viveur
 Mohamed El Shorbagy, Egyptian squash player
 Ella Eyre, singer-songwriter

F
 Mark Foster, Olympic swimmer; world record holder 25m and 50m freestyle, Commonwealth, European and world champion 50m freestyle
 Timothy Fok, Chinese businessman and sports administrator 
 Helen Fox, novelist

G
 Ruth George, Labour politician and MP for High Peak
 Roger Gibbs, financier and philanthropist
 Victoria Glendinning, writer and broadcaster
 Helen Glover, two-time Olympic gold medal-winning rower
 Sir Charles Godfrey, British zoologist
 Edward Goldsmith, environmentalist, writer and philosopher
 Sir James Goldsmith, businessman, financier and politician
 Kaveh Golestan, photojournalist
 Duncan Goodhew, 1980 Olympic Gold Medallist in 100m breaststroke
 David Graveney, England cricket selector
 James Guy, 2017 World Swimming Championships Bronze Medal 100m butterfly

H
 Rory Hamilton-Brown, Sussex, Surrey and England U19 cricketer
 Richard Harding (1968–1971),  England rugby union international and captain
 Will Harries, rugby player, winger currently playing for Newport Gwent Dragons
 Adam Hastings, rugby union player for Gloucester and Scotland
 David Heath, politician
 Christopher Hellings, cricketer
 James Hewitt, army officer and purported lover of Diana, Princess of Wales
 James Hildreth Somerset cricketer
 Prince Abbas Hilmi, Egyptian prince and financial manager
 Matthew Hobden, 1993–2016, late Sussex cricketer
 Ben Hollioake, 1977–2002, late England and Surrey cricketer
 Martin Hughes-Games (1970 & 1975,) is a natural history programme producer and presenter for the BBC.
 Jon Hunt, businessman
 Princess Alia bint Hussein, Jordanian princess

J
 Ed Jackson, Newport Gwent Dragons professional rugby union player
 Margot James, politician
 Sarah Jarvis, General Practitioner and Broadcaster.
 Giorgio Jegher, Tokyo 1964 Olympics
 Will Jenkins, cricketer
 Huw Jones, Scottish rugby union player
 Simon Jones, England and Glamorgan cricketer
 Jonathan Joseph, England and Bath professional rugby union player

K
 Dominic Kelly, Hampshire cricketer
 Ruth Kelly, Labour politician
 Sharif Khan, squash player
 Aditya Khanna, Indian entrepreneur and investor 
 Arvind Khanna, Indian politician, businessman and philanthropist
 Nabila Khashoggi (born 1962), American actress and businesswoman
 Craig Kieswetter, England and Somerset cricketer
 Ömer Koç, Turkish businessman 
 John Kovalic, cartoonist and game designer

L
 Richard Lane, rugby union player
 Kevin Latouf, former Hampshire cricketer
 Rose Leslie, actress
 Robin Lett, cricketer
 Ian Liddell-Grainger, politician
Hugh Lindsay, Former equerry to Elizabeth II

M
 John Mallett, England rugby player
 Simon Mantell, England international and Olympic hockey player
Peter Marshall, English professional squash player
 Rosalind Maskell, microbiologist
 Will Matthews, rugby player
 Simon Mawer, author
 Tom Maynard, late first class cricketer, 1989-2012
 Keith McAdam, former cricketer and physician 
 John McFall, Paralympic sprinter
 Tyrone Mings, Aston Villa FC and England footballer
 Clare Montgomery, barrister and judge 
 Olly Morgan, Gloucester and England rugby player
 Max Mosley, former president of the FIA
 Lady Tatiana Mountbatten

N
 Arun Nayar, former husband of Liz Hurley
 Conor Niland, Irish professional tennis player
 John Norman, first-class cricketer
 Lando Norris, Formula 1 racing driver
 Ben Nugent, Professional Footballer

O
 Chris Oti, Nottingham, England and Wasps professional rugby union player
 Mark Odejobi, England rugby player for Esher
 Peter Openshaw, British physician and immunologist

P
 Sharan Pasricha (born 1980), hotelier
 Matt Perry, British Lions and England rugby international
 Lady Melissa Percy (born 1987), fashion designer
 Alex Pettyfer, actor, played Alex Rider in Stormbreaker
 Daniel Poleshchuk (born 1996), Israeli squash player
 Ciaran Prendeville (born 1988), transfer pricing specialist

Q 

 Marc Quinn, British sculptor and painter

R
 Reuben Reid, footballer, currently playing for Plymouth Argyle
 Michael Ridpath, novelist
 Chris Robshaw, former England Captain and Harlequins professional rugby union player
 Peter Roebuck, late Somerset first-class cricketer and cricket columnist (1956–2011)
 Roland Rudd, PR executive, Chairman of Finsbury and campaigner on Europe, former Chair of People's Vote. Since 2019, chairman of the Board of Governors of Millfield.
 Rhys Ruddock, professional rugby union player for Leinster and Ireland

S
 John Sergeant, journalist and broadcaster
 John Senior, founder of Heroes Welcome UK
Callum Sheedy, Rugby Union player, Bristol Bears & Wales 
 Nicollette Sheridan, British actress (Knots Landing and Desperate Housewives)
 Padmanabh Singh, Indian polo player and member of the former royal family of Jaipur State
 Jemma Simpson, British Olympian 2008 and international Athlete - Athletics  
 Sir Benjamin Slade, 7th Bt., businessman and star of The Guest Wing, a programme on Sky Atlantic in 2012.
 Julian Smith, Conservative MP
 John Standing, actor

T

 Harvey Trump, Somerset cricketer
 Jeremy Thomas, film producer 
 Rosie Thomas (writer)

V
 Maha Vajiralongkorn, King of Thailand
 Mako Vunipola, Saracens and England rugby player

W
 Jehangir Wadia, Indian businessman
 Ness Wadia, Indian businessman
 Ben Wallace, Conservative MP
 Max Waller, Professional Cricketer (Somerset CC)
 Ian Ward, England, Surrey and Sussex cricketer
 JPR Williams, British Lions and Wales rugby international
 Harry Williamson, musician
 Peter Wilson, gold medal-winning Olympian sport shooter
 Sarah Winckless, world champion and Olympic rower

References

External links
OM Society website
Millfield A school for all seasons - a history of the school by former pupils and masters
Millfield School website

 
Millfield
Somerset-related lists